"Banquet"/"Staying Fat" is a double A-side single by Bloc Party. A follow-up to "She's Hearing Voices", it was released in May 2004 on Moshi Moshi Records, following the band's support slot for several dates with ex-Blur guitarist Graham Coxon. It became something of a cult hit, the low budget video picking up numerous plays on MTV2, with the single eventually charting just outside the top 50 in the UK Singles Chart.

Both tracks were later included on the band's self-titled EP compilation CD, while "Banquet" was later re-recorded for Bloc Party's debut album Silent Alarm and re-released as a single.

Track listing

CD (Limited Edition):: MOSHI10CD (UK) 
 "Banquet"
 "Staying Fat"
(only 2000 made)

7" (Limited Edition): MOSHI10 (UK)
 "Banquet"
 "Staying Fat"
(only 500 made)

Charts

References

2004 singles
Bloc Party songs
2004 songs